Lanbi may refer to:
Ampelocissus africana,  a woody vine of the grape family
Lanbi Kyun, an island in the Mergui Archipelago, Burma